"Angel" is a song by Jamaican reggae artist Shaggy featuring additional vocals from Barbadian singer Rayvon. Containing samples from Steve Miller Band's "The Joker" and the Chip Taylor-written "Angel of the Morning", it was released to radio on 9 January 2001 as the follow-up to Shaggy's international number-one hit, "It Wasn't Me". "Angel" also proved to be successful, reaching number one in 12 countries, including Australia, Germany, Ireland, the United Kingdom, and the United States.

Content
"Angel" uses the bassline from "The Joker" by Steve Miller Band (1973). The chorus melody is from "Angel of the Morning", originally written and composed by Chip Taylor, that has been recorded numerous times and has been a hit single for various artists, including Merrilee Rush and Juice Newton.

Commercial reception
The song debuted at number 81 on the US Billboard Hot 100 on the week ending 30 December 2000. The song first entered the top 40 at number 39 on the week ending 20 January 2001. It peaked at number one on the chart week of 31 March 2001, for one week. According to Billboard writer Silvio Pietroluongo, "Angel" beat Crazy Town's "Butterfly" to number one by a margin of two points, which was the smallest gap between two singles since the magazine began having its charts stored digitally in 1985. It was also the second song to reach number one without a retail release, after Aaliyah's "Try Again" (2000), although physical formats would later be issued in the United States on 24 April 2001. "Angel" was the 17th-most-successful song of 2001 in the US and has sold 1,494,000 digital copies in the US as of April 2016.

Internationally, the song reached number one in Australia, Austria, Flanders, Germany, Ireland, the Netherlands, Norway, Portugal, Sweden, Switzerland, and the United Kingdom, topping the Eurochart Hot 100 as well. In Australia, it peaked atop the ARIA Singles Chart for eight weeks, finishing fourth on the Australian year-end chart for 2001. It was also an enduring hit in Ireland, where it is the 20th-highest-selling single of all time.

Music video

The music video was directed by Cameron Casey. It features Shaggy and Rayvon relaxing in a private plane and driving around in luxury cars.

Track listings

US maxi-CD single
 "Angel" (album version)
 "Angel" (remix)
 "Angel" (instrumental)
 "Angel" (live)

US 7-inch single
A. "Angel" – 3:55
B. "Chica Bonita" – 4:02

US 12-inch single
A1. "Angel" (album version) – 3:55
B1. "Angel" (Dance Hall remix) – 3:51
B2. "Angel" (Dance Hall remix instrumental) – 3:51

Australian and European maxi-CD single
 "Angel" (radio edit) — 3:31
 "Angel" (Seabreeze mix) — 3:46
 "It Wasn't Me" (Crash & Burn remix featuring Rikrok) — 5:37
 "Angel" (enhanced video)

European CD single
 "Angel" (radio edit) — 3:31
 "Angel" (Seabreeze mix) — 3:46

UK CD single
 "Angel" (radio edit)
 "Angel" (Crash & Burn remix)
 "Angel" (Seabreeze mix)
 "Angel" (video)

UK 12-inch single
A1. "Angel" (Crash & Burn remix)
AA1. "Angel" (Seabreeze mix)
AA2. "Angel" (radio edit)

UK cassette single
 "Angel" (radio edit)
 "Angel" (Crash & Burn remix)
 "Angel" (Seabreeze mix)

Credits and personnel
Credits are taken from the Hot Shot album booklet.

Studios
 Recorded at Big Yard Studios (Jamaica), Ranch Recording Studios (Valley Stream, New York), and HC&F Studio (Freeport, New York)
 Mixed at Ranch Recording Studios (Valley Stream, New York)
 Mastered at Sterling Sound (New York City)

Personnel

 Steve Miller – writing
 Ahmet Ertegun – writing
 Eddie Curtis – writing
 Chip Taylor – writing
 Gordon Dukes – background vocals
 Robert Zapata – guitar
 Phillip George Henry – guitar
 Carlos Sanchez – keyboard
 Shaun "Sting" Pizzonia – drums, production, recording, mixing
 Chris Gehringer – mastering

Charts

Weekly charts

Year-end charts

Decade-end charts

All-time charts

Certifications and sales

Release history

Later versions
 German singer Max Raabe and Palast Orchester covered the song in a big band style, for his 2001 album, Super Hits 2.
 In 2001, the parody song "You Ripped Off Angel (of the Morning)" was released by Adam Posegate and received airplay on the Dr. Demento Show.
 R&B artist Bei Maejor did a version of this song sampling the chorus and the beat. It appeared on his mixtape Upsideown2.
 For the 20th anniversary re-recording of Hot Shot, Rayvon's part is performed by Sting instead.

See also

 List of Billboard Hot 100 number-one singles of 2001
 List of best-selling singles and albums of 2001 in Ireland
 List of UK Singles Chart number ones of the 2000s

References

2000 songs
2001 singles
Billboard Hot 100 number-one singles
Dutch Top 40 number-one singles
European Hot 100 Singles number-one singles
Irish Singles Chart number-one singles
MCA Records singles
Number-one singles in Australia
Number-one singles in Austria
Number-one singles in Germany
Number-one singles in Norway
Number-one singles in Portugal
Number-one singles in Scotland
Number-one singles in Sweden
Number-one singles in Switzerland
Shaggy (musician) songs
Songs written by Ahmet Ertegun
Songs written by Chip Taylor
Songs written by Eddie Curtis
Songs written by Shaggy (musician)
Songs written by Steve Miller (musician)
UK Singles Chart number-one singles
Ultratop 50 Singles (Flanders) number-one singles